Alexandra Vasilyevna Burchenkova (born 16 September 1988) is a Russian road racing cyclist.

Burchenkova participated at the 2008 Summer Olympics in the road race finishing 43rd. In 2010, she won a gold medal at the European Road Championships. In 2011, she won the Tour de Bretagne

References

External links
 
 

1988 births
Living people
People from Velikiye Luki
Russian female cyclists
Cyclists at the 2008 Summer Olympics
Olympic cyclists of Russia
Sportspeople from Pskov Oblast